Brad Joseph Lyons (born 26 May 1997) is a Northern Irish professional footballer who plays for Scottish club Kilmarnock, as a midfielder.

Career
Lyons began his career in the Irish Premiership with Coleraine. After helping Coleraine win the Irish Cup, in September 2018 he moved on loan to English club Blackburn Rovers, with the deal to become permanent in January 2019. In January 2019 he signed a permanent 18-month contract, his first ever professional contract. He stated that he wanted to break into the Blackburn first-team. Later that month he moved on loan to St Mirren. He was sent off 28 minutes into his debut, in the Scottish Cup, on 19 January 2019. He was offered a new contract by Blackburn at the end of the 2019–20 season.

In December 2020 he appeared in a Blackburn Rovers' first-team match day squad for the first time since he signed for the club. He moved on loan to Morecambe in January 2021.

On 14 May 2021 it was announced that he would leave Blackburn at the end of the season, following the expiry of his contract.

On 17 June 2021, it was announced that Lyons would join Scottish Championship side Kilmarnock on a two-year deal following the expiry of his Blackburn contract.

References

1997 births
Living people
Association footballers from Northern Ireland
Coleraine F.C. players
Blackburn Rovers F.C. players
St Mirren F.C. players
Morecambe F.C. players
Kilmarnock F.C. players
NIFL Premiership players
Scottish Professional Football League players
Association football midfielders
English Football League players